General elections were held in Niger on 27 December 2020 to elect the President and National Assembly. As no presidential candidate received a majority of the vote, a second round was held on 21 February 2021. Mohamed Bazoum was declared the winner in the second round with 55.67% of the vote.

Background 
Incumbent president Mahamadou Issoufou completed his second term in 2021 and publicly committed to stepping down, paving the way for the country's first peaceful transition of power since independence. A record number of 41 candidates applied to run for president, but only 30 were accepted. Included in the 11 rejected candidates was Hama Amadou, candidate of the main opposition party, whose application was denied by the constitutional court due to his previous imprisonment for a year in a case of baby trafficking. Amadou, who came second in the 2016 and third in the 2011 elections, has denied all the charges and claimed they were politically motivated.

Electoral system
The president is elected using the two-round system; if no candidate receives a majority of the vote in the first round, a second round will be held on 20 February 2021.

The 171 members of the National Assembly are elected by two methods; 158 members are elected from eight multi-member constituencies based on the seven regions and Niamey by party-list proportional representation. A further eight seats are reserved for minority groups and are elected from single-member constituencies held under first-past-the-post voting. Normally, five seats (one for each permanently-inhabited continent) are reserved for Nigeriens living abroad, all elected from single-member constituencies by first-past-the-post voting. However, in the months preceding the election, the registered voters list for Nigeriens living outside of the country wasn't kept up to date, leading to the elections for their five seats not being held. This de facto lowered the total of seats in the chamber to 166, and the amount needed for a majority to 84.

Results

President

The first round of the elections resulted in Mohamed Bazoum leading with 39.30% of the vote, while former president Mahamane Ousmane came second with 16.99%. Thus, a second round took place between them on February 21 to determine the next president of Niger.
On 23 February, The Independent National Electoral Commission (CÉNI) announced that Mohamed Bazoum, former interior minister and candidate of the ruling party, won the second round of the Nigerien presidential election with 55.67% of the valid votes: "These results are provisional and must be submitted to the Constitutional Court for analysis," said Issaka Souna, president of the CÉNI, before the diplomatic corps and the Nigerien authorities gathered at the Niamey convention center.

National Assembly
Due to the registered voters list for Nigeriens living abroad not being kept up to date, the elections for five overseas seats were not held, lowering the total of seats to 166.

The PNDS won 79 seats. MODEN FA came second with 19 seats, the MPR third with 14 seats and the MNSD fourth with 13 seats each. The remainder were taken by smaller or minor parties.

Aftermath
Following the elections, protesters demanded the government of Mohamed Bazoum resign and the result be recounted. Two people were killed during the demonstrations on 25–26 February when police fired tear gas at protesters. Protesters threw stones at the soldiers in military vehicles who patrolled and clashed with demonstrators in Niamey. Protests lasted three days, starting on 23 February.

References

External links
 Independent National Electoral Commission of Niger (in French)
 Niger's 2010 (present) Constitution with amendments through 2017 from constituteproject.org

Niger
General election
Niger
General election
Nigerien general election
Elections in Niger
Nigerien general election
Presidential elections in Niger
Election and referendum articles with incomplete results